Razzi is an Italian surname. Notable people with the surname include:

 Antonio Razzi (born 1948), Italian politician
 Claudia Razzi (born 1963), Italian voice actress and dubbing director
 Maria Angelica Razzi, Italian sixteenth century nun and sculptor
 Ottobuono di Razzi (died 1315), Italian clergyman and feudal lord, Patriarch of Aquileia
 Serafino Razzi (1531–1613), Italian Dominican friar

Italian-language surnames